The Ministry of Parliamentary Relations and Constitutional Affairs (MoPRCA)  is a member of the Somaliland cabinet, responsible for handling affairs relating to the Parliament of Somaliland and Constitution of Somaliland, it also works as a link between the two chambers, (House of Representatives, the lower house) and the (House of Elders, the upper house).
The current Minister is Mohamed Adan Elmi.

See also

 Constitution of Somaliland
 Parliament of Somaliland
 Politics of Somaliland

References

External links
Official Site of the Government of Somaliland

Government of Somaliland
Politics of Somaliland
Government ministries of Somaliland